Mangelia gemmula is a species of sea snail, a marine gastropod mollusk in the family Mangeliidae.

Description
This species is similar to Mangelia tranquilla H. Barnard, 1958 but shows 12 axial plicae.

Distribution
This marine species occurs off Port Alfred, South Africa.

References

 Turton, William Harry. The marine shells of Port Alfred, S. Africa. H. Milford, Oxford University Press, 1932.

External links
  Tucker, J.K. 2004 Catalog of recent and fossil turrids (Mollusca: Gastropoda). Zootaxa 682:1–1295.
 

Endemic fauna of South Africa
gemmula
Gastropods described in 1932